A Vivaldi antenna or Vivaldi aerial or tapered slot antenna is a co-planar broadband-antenna, which can be made from a solid piece of sheet metal, a printed circuit board, or from a dielectric plate metalized on one or both sides.

The feeding line excites an open space via a microstrip line or coaxial cable, and may be terminated with a sector-shaped area or a direct coaxial connection. From the open space area the energy reaches an exponentially tapered pattern via a symmetrical slot line.

Vivaldi antennas can be made for linear polarized waves or – using two devices arranged in orthogonal direction – for transmitting / receiving both polarization orientations.

If fed with 90-degree phase-shifted signals, orthogonal devices can transmit/receive circular-oriented electromagnetic waves.

Vivaldi antennas are useful for any frequency, as all antennas are scalable in size for use at any frequency. Printed circuit technology makes this type antenna cost effective at microwave frequencies exceeding 1 GHz.

Advantages of Vivaldi antennas are their broadband characteristics (suitable for ultra-wideband signals ), their easy manufacturing process using common methods for PCB production, and their easy impedance matching to the feeding line using microstrip line modeling methods.

The MWEE collection of EM simulation benchmarks includes a Vivaldi antenna.

References

Radio frequency antenna types